Cinnamomum tenuifolium, commonly known as Japanese cinnamon, is an evergreen tree in the genus Cinnamomum. In China it is under second-class national protection.

Range and habitat
Cinnamomum tenuifolium is known from 40 to 50 localities in southern Japan, southern Korea, Taiwan, and Anhui, Fujian, Jiangsu, Jiangxi, and Zhejiang provinces of eastern China. The species has a large extent of occurrence (EOO) of 1,235,974 km2, and an area of occupancy (AOO) of 68 km2.

Its typical habitat is lowland evergreen forest between 300 to 1,000 meters elevation.

Conservation and threats
Cinnamomum tenuifolium is affected by habitat loss from deforestation and conversion of forests to agriculture and plantations. The species' extent of occurrence and area of occupancy are declining. Despite declining habitat, the species' conservation status is assessed Least Concern in consideration of its wide extent of occurrence and large number of locations.

Uses
The timber is hard and durable, and is used for furniture and house construction.

Volatile oil from the bark and leafy branchlets is used as perfume. Oil and fat from fruit kernels is used to make soap.

References

External links
Cinnamon species page from multilingual multiscript plant name database

tenuifolium
Spices
Trees of China
Trees of Japan
Trees of Korea
Flora of Taiwan
Taxobox binomials not recognized by IUCN